Titus Mlengeya Dismas Kamani (born 14 November 1957) is a Tanzanian CCM politician and Member of Parliament for Busega constituency since 2010. He is the current Minister of Livestock and Fisheries Development.

References

1957 births
Living people
Chama Cha Mapinduzi MPs
Tanzanian MPs 2010–2015
Old Moshi Secondary School alumni
Sokoine University of Agriculture alumni
Alumni of the University of Reading
College of African Wildlife Management alumni